Lightning (German:Wetterleuchten) is a 1925 German silent drama film directed by Rudolf Walther-Fein.

The film's art direction was by Botho Hoefer and Bernhard Schwidewski

Cast
In alphabetical order
 Victor Colani 
 William Dieterle 
 Lia Eibenschütz 
 Kara Guhl 
 Oscar Marion 
 Frida Richard 
 Alphons Schünemann

References

Bibliography
 Grange, William. Cultural Chronicle of the Weimar Republic. Scarecrow Press, 2008.

External links

1925 films
1925 drama films
German drama films
Films of the Weimar Republic
Films directed by Rudolf Walther-Fein
German silent feature films
German black-and-white films
Silent drama films
1920s German films
1920s German-language films